Francova Lhota is a municipality and village in Vsetín District in the Zlín Region of the Czech Republic. It has about 1,500 inhabitants. It lies on the border with Slovakia.

Administrative parts
The village of Pulčín is an administrative part of Francova Lhota.

Notable people
Štěpán Trochta (1905–1974), Roman Catholic cardinal, Bishop of Litoměřice

References

External links

  

Villages in Vsetín District
Czech Republic–Slovakia border crossings
Moravian Wallachia